Jaunogre Station is a railway station on the Riga – Daugavpils Railway in Latvia.

References 

Railway stations in Latvia
Railway stations opened in 1928